Christian W. Slagle (November 17, 1821 – September 26(?), 1882) was an acting President of the University of Iowa, serving from 1877–1878.

Presidents of the University of Iowa
1821 births
1882 deaths
19th-century American educators